In Becoming a Ghost is the fourth studio album by The Faceless.  It was released on December 1, 2017 through Sumerian Records. It is the only album with Abigail Williams' Ken Sorceron on vocals, The Zenith Passage's Justin McKinney on guitar and Chason Westmoreland, formerly of Hate Eternal, session drumming. The album debuted at #66 on the Billboard Top Current Albums chart.

Michael Keene tracked the bass on the entire album by himself. This is also the first The Faceless LP to feature songs recorded with Drop A tuning using seven string guitars as well as E standard tuning on 6 string guitars. It is their first full-length release in five years, the last being 2012's Autotheism.

Background, recording, and promotion 

In a July 2016 interview with Metal Injection, guitarist Justin McKinney stated that In Becoming a Ghost (which at the time was still officially unnamed) was "pretty much done". McKinney had joined in February of the same year. In April 2017 in an interview with The PRP, Keene speculated at an August release date.

Only one single, "Digging the Grave" was released in promotion of the album's December release date.

The first single from the album, "The Spiraling Void", from September 2015, as well as the second single, "Black Star", released over two years later in June 2017, were put out before an official release date was set for the album.

"The Spiraling Void" featured Derek Rydquist on vocals. Rydquist was no longer in a position to tour, but remaining good friends with Michael, he recorded the track with both parties knowing he wouldn’t be touring with the group. Keene has said that “Derek will always have a place in The Faceless. Be it just recording or occasional appearances”. Rydquist appeared on several other songs on the record as well.

This was also the first record to include a cover song. A very unique take on the song “Shake the Disease” by Depeche Mode was part of the track listing. This would prove to be by far the most experimental record by The Faceless to date.

Release & reception

Metal Injection reviewer Michael Pementel gave the album 9.5/10, calling it a "magnificent work of sinister mysteries and pure artistry."

Track listing
Music written by Michael Keene, except where noted.

Personnel 

The Faceless
 Michael "Machine" Keene – all rhythm and all lead guitars (except solo at 4:52 on “Digging The Grave” and solo at 5:09 on “Black Star”), clean vocals, Orchestral Arrangements on all songs, bass, keyboards, vocoder, programming
 Justin McKinney – guitar solos on “Digging the Grave” and “Black Star”, partial orchestration contribution on ”Cup of Mephistopheles” (at 1:49 to 2:39),
 Chason Westmoreland – drums
 Ken "Sorceron" Bergeron – screamed vocals

Guest appearances
 Sergio Flores – flute solo on “Digging the Grave”
 Derek "Demon Carcass" Rydquist – lead vocals on "The Spiraling Void", additional vocals on "Shake the Disease", and "I Am"

Charts

References

The Faceless albums
Sumerian Records albums
2017 albums